The 1976 St. Louis Cardinals season was the 57th season the franchise was in the league. The team failed to improve on their previous output of 11–3, instead regressing by one win. This was the first time in three seasons the team did not qualify for the playoffs.

Ultimately, the Cardinals became the only NFC team to win ten games without making the playoffs under a 14-game schedule.

Offseason

NFL Draft

Roster

Schedule

Standings

References 

1976
St. Louis Cardinals
St. Louis Cardinals